Cool School is a 2007 Turkish comedy film, directed by Faruk Aksoy, about a class of teenage students attempting to save their unconventional school from closure.

Plot
A private education institute on the edge of bankruptcy is about to be closed down. An initially reluctant student body, lured to the institute by the promise of learning in a holiday village, join the staff to stop the closure by entering an inter-school contest in the hope of winning first place and the money to save their school.

Cast

Production
The film was shot on location in Antalya, Turkey.

Release

Reception
The film was number one at the Turkish box office for two weeks running and was one of the highest grossing Turkish films of 2007 with a total gross of US$4,265,287.

References

External links
 

2007 films
2000s teen comedy films
Films set in schools
Films set in Turkey
Turkish teen comedy films
Films shot in Turkey
2007 comedy films
2000s Turkish-language films